My Husband and I may refer to:

My Husband and I (1956 TV series), British sitcom starring Evelyn Laye and Frank Lawton
My Husband and I (1987 TV series), British sitcom starring Mollie Sugden and William Moore